Alun Rees (born 18 October 1992) is a Welsh rugby union player, currently playing for United Rugby Championship side Cardiff. His preferred position is hooker92.

Cardiff
Rees was called into Cardiff's European squad ahead of their European campaign. He made his debut for Cardiff in the second round of the 2021–22 European Rugby Champions Cup against , coming on as a replacement.

References

External links
itsrugby.co.uk Profile

1992 births
Living people
Welsh rugby union players
Dragons RFC players
Cardiff Rugby players
Rugby union hookers